The Dabie Mountains are a major mountain range located in central China. Running northwest-to-southeast, they form the main watershed between the Huai and Yangtze rivers. The range also marks the boundary between Hubei Province and its neighbors of Henan (to the north) and Anhui (to the east).

Landscape
The range is heavily forested (about 85% coverage) and yields valuable bamboo as well as oak, particularly cork oak, making it China's chief cork-producing area. The region is median income, and subsistence agriculture is the heart of its economy with rice and tea predominating.

The main transportation route across the higher range is from Macheng in Hubei to Huangchuan in Hunan, through the Huai River valley. The main rail and road crossings go north from Wuhan, through the lower elevations.

In 2009, the high-speed Hewu Passenger Railway opened, connecting Hefei and Wuhan along a short and direct route. It uses numerous tunnels when crossing the mountain range.

Other notable major railways lines that passes through the Dabie Mountains include the Beijing-Guangzhou high-speed railway that connects Beijing and Guangzhou via Wuhan. Numerous tunnels are used when crossing the mountain range between Zhumadian and Wuhan

Geology
Geologically, the Dabie Mountains are characterized by the occurrence of eclogite-facies ultrahigh-pressure metamorphic rocks. Geographically, the range is a complex, stressed structure, making it and the surrounding area subject to earthquakes. In late 2005, a 5.7 magnitude earthquake centered in the northwest corner of Jiangxi province, just south of Jiujiang on the Yangtze killed at least 15 people, injured hundreds, and left several thousand people homeless. It caused tremors in Qichun County in Hubei province and beyond, even reaching as far as the provincial capital of Wuhan.

International Forest Park
This scenic park centered on Tiantangzhai is a key tourist attraction in the highest part of the Dabie mountain range. Total area of the park is 300 square kilometers. Located in Hubei province's Luotian County and close to the border with Anhui Province, the park is about 68 kilometers from Luotian town, 140 kilometers from Macheng, 150 kilometers from Huangshi, and 210 kilometers from the Hubei provincial capital, Wuhan.

References

 Dabeishan International Forest Park website (with many photographs), in Chinese.
 Huanggang Government website page on Dabie Mountains (in Chinese)

Mountain ranges of China
Geography of Central China
Mountain ranges of Hubei
Mountains of Henan
Mountains of Anhui